A v Home Secretary (No 2) [2005] UKHL 71 is a UK constitutional law case, concerning the rule of law.

Facts
Information, obtained through torture of terrorist suspects by US armed forces and passed to UK officials, had been presented to the Special Immigration Appeals Commission as part of the Crown's case to justify the indefinite detention in HMP Belmarsh of individuals suspected of offences related to terrorism.

Judgment
The House of Lords held that evidence obtained or likely obtained by torture committed abroad by a foreign state’s agents is inadmissible in proceedings before the Special Immigration Appeals Commission.

Lord Bingham said the following.

See also

United Kingdom constitutional law

Notes

References

United Kingdom constitutional case law